The 1984–85 Ranji Trophy was the 51st season of the Ranji Trophy. The season was preceded by celebrations on the completion of fifty years and a one-day series by Australia. Mumbai won their 30th title defeating Delhi in the final considered one of the best in the history of Ranji Trophy. During the tournament, Ravi Shastri batting for Mumbai against Baroda, scored a double-century in 113 minutes, a record that would stand for more than thirty years.

Group stage

South Zone

West Zone

Central Zone

North Zone

East Zone

Knockout stage

Final

Scorecards and averages
Cricketarchive

References

External links

1985 in Indian cricket
Domestic cricket competitions in 1984–85
Ranji Trophy seasons